Revolverheld is the debut album by German band Revolverheld. It was released by Sony BMG on 23 September 2005 in German-speaking Europe.

Track listing
All songs written by Johannes Strate, Niels Grötsch, Kristoffer Hünecke.

Charts

Weekly charts

Year-end charts

Certifications

References

2005 albums
German-language albums
Revolverheld albums